Ginni Mansberg (born 1968 in Sydney, Australia) is a General Practitioner and television presenter in Australia. She is best known for her frequent appearances on Channel Seven's morning TV shows Sunrise and The Morning Show, and as the co-host of Embarrassing Bodies Down Under, which was broadcast in 2013.

She is a practising GP in Sans Souci in Sydney.

Career 
In addition to being a physician, she has also worked in the media as a columnist, author, and former political advisor.

She was the co-author (with Anne Thomson) of the book Why Am I So Tired? She is also the medical advisor for the magazines Practical Parenting and Women's Health.

Mansberg studied medicine at the University of Newcastle and her first child was born shortly after her internship at Prince of Wales Hospital, Sydney. She worked part-time as a GP and while completing a degree in journalism at the University of Technology, started writing for medical magazines and health outlets.

In 2008, Mansberg worked as a media advisor to Joe Hockey and advised on the Coalition's health policy.

In 2013, she hosted Embarrassing Bodies Down Under on Lifestyle You, a factual television program that explores embarrassing medical issues. The series was an Australian version of the UK show, Embarrassing Bodies. The show was also hosted by Christian Jessen who hosts the UK version of the program, Brad McKay, and Sam Hay. In 2015 the show was broadcast on the Nine Network.

In 2019 it was announced that she was going to be a judge on a new SBS program Medicine or Myth alongside Charlie Teo.

Books

References

External links
 

Living people
1968 births
Australian columnists
Australian women columnists
Australian women journalists
Australian freelance journalists
Australian television personalities
Women television personalities